D'Inzeo is an Italian surname. Notable people with the surname include:

Piero D'Inzeo (1923–2014), Italian show jumping rider
Raimondo D'Inzeo (1925–2013), Italian show jumping rider, brother of Piero

Italian-language surnames